Uttam Galva Steels Ltd is one of the largest manufacturers  cold rolled steel (CR) and galvanized steel (GP) in Western India. The company procures hot rolled steel and processes it into CR and further into GP and colour-coated coils.

Uttam Galva group also runs two more plants in India: Uttam Galva Metallics Limited and Uttam Value Steels Limited (previously known as Lloyds Steel Industries Limited) both at Wardha, Maharashtra.

Uttam group are going to double its Wardha plant's capacity. Also it is going to set up a new integrated steel plant in Satarda, Maharashtra.

References

Manufacturing companies based in Mumbai
Indian companies established in 1985
Steel companies of India
1985 establishments in Maharashtra
Companies listed on the National Stock Exchange of India
Companies listed on the Bombay Stock Exchange